Richard Stehlík (born June 22, 1984) is a Slovak professional ice hockey defenceman. He is currently a free agent having last played for Dragons de Rouen in France's Ligue Magnus. Stehlik was selected by the Nashville Predators in the 3rd round (76th overall) of the 2003 NHL Entry Draft.

Stehlík previously played for HK 36 Skalica, Sherbrooke Beavers, HK Dukla Trenčín, HC Sparta Praha and HC Vítkovice Steel.

Career statistics

Regular season and playoffs

International

References

External links

1984 births
Atlant Moscow Oblast players
Dragons de Rouen players
EC VSV players
HK Dukla Trenčín players
HC Kometa Brno players
HC Oceláři Třinec players
HC Sparta Praha players
HC Vítkovice players
HK 36 Skalica players
HPK players
Lewiston Maineiacs players
Living people
MHk 32 Liptovský Mikuláš players
Milwaukee Admirals players
Modo Hockey players
Nashville Predators draft picks
Sportspeople from Skalica
Sherbrooke Castors players
Slovak ice hockey defencemen
Salavat Yulaev Ufa players
Slovak expatriate ice hockey players in Canada
Slovak expatriate ice hockey players in the United States
Slovak expatriate ice hockey players in Russia
Slovak expatriate ice hockey players in the Czech Republic
Slovak expatriate ice hockey players in Sweden
Slovak expatriate ice hockey players in Finland
Expatriate ice hockey players in Austria
Expatriate ice hockey players in France
Slovak expatriate sportspeople in Austria
Slovak expatriate sportspeople in France